Umeyashiki Station (梅屋敷駅) is the name of two train stations in Japan:

 Umeyashiki Station (Nara)
 Umeyashiki Station (Tokyo)